Margaret Mortimer, Baroness Berkeley (2 May 1304 – 5 May 1337) was the wife of Thomas de Berkeley, 3rd Baron Berkeley. She was the eldest daughter of Roger Mortimer, 1st Earl of March, the de facto ruler of England from 1327 to 1330, and his wife Joan de Geneville, Baroness Geneville.

Family
Margaret Mortimer was the eldest of the twelve children of Roger Mortimer, 1st Earl of March and Joan de Geneville, Baroness Geneville. Her paternal grandparents were Edmund Mortimer, 2nd Baron Mortimer and Margaret de Fiennes. Her maternal grandparents were Piers de Geneville, of Trim Castle and Ludlow, and Jeanne of Lusignan.

Marriage and death
Her father Roger proposed the marriage of his eldest daughter Margaret to Maurice de Berkeley, 2nd Baron Berkeley's son and heir Thomas. From Roger's point of view, the marriage was meant to secure an earlier alliance with an important lord of the Welsh Marshes. Margaret was duly married to Thomas de Berkeley in May 1319. He succeeded his father as 3rd Baron Berkeley in 1326. They had the following issue:

 Maurice de Berkeley (born 1320, date of death unknown), who succeeded his father as Baron de Berkeley.
 Thomas de Berkeley, (born c. 1325, date of death unknown)
 Roger de Berkeley (born 1326, date of death unknown)
 Alphonsus de Berkeley (born 1327, date of death unknown)
 Joan de Berkeley (born 1330 – 1369), married Sir Reginald Cobham.
 John de Berkeley (born 1326) 
Their eldest son Maurice married Elizabeth le Despenser, despite the fact that it had been his grandfather Roger Mortimer that was namely responsible for the execution of Elizabeth's father Hugh le Despenser in 1326.

Later life
After her father's fall from power in 1322, Margaret was arrested. In 1324, she was sent to Sholdham Priory. Her marriage to Berkeley was confirmed, and her offspring declared legitimate by Pope John XXII in 1329.

Margaret died on 5 May 1337. She was buried at St. Augustine's Abbey, Bristol, Gloucestershire. After her death, her husband married again to Catherine born Clivedon.

Ancestry

References

Works cited
 

1304 births
1337 deaths
Daughters of British earls
Margaret
Margaret
Berkeley
14th-century English people
14th-century English women